Bananamour is the fourth studio album by Kevin Ayers and it featured some of his most accessible recordings, including "Shouting in a Bucket Blues" and his whimsical tribute to Syd Barrett, "Oh! Wot A Dream". After Whatevershebringswesing, Ayers assembled a new band anchored by drummer Eddie Sparrow and bassist Archie Legget and employed a more direct lyricism. The centrepiece of the album is "Decadence", his withering portrait of Nico: "Watch her out there on display / Dancing in her sleepy way / While all her visions start to play / On the icicles of our decay / And all along the desert shore / She wanders further evermore / The only thing that's left to try / She says to live I have to die." The song was later covered by the Australian psychedelic rock band The Church on their 1999 album A Box of Birds.

The album marked the end of Ayers' first Harvest Records series.

Track listing 

All songs written by Kevin Ayers

Personnel

Musicians
 Kevin Ayers – guitar, vocals
 Archie Legget – bass, harmony vocals, lead vocal (track 3)
 Eddie Sparrow – drums

Additional musicians
 Steve Hillage – lead guitar (track 2)
 Mike Ratledge – organ (track 4)
 Robert Wyatt – harmony vocal (track 8)
 David Bedford – orchestral arrangement (track 9)
 Howie Casey – tenor saxophone
 Dave Caswell – trumpet
 Tristan Fry – cymbal
 Lyle Jenkins – baritone saxophone
 Ronnie Price – piano
 Barry St. John, Liza Strike, Doris Troy – backing vocals

Technical
 Kevin Ayers – producer
 Andrew King – producer
 John Kurlander – engineer
 Bob Lawrie – cover art
 Richard Imrie – photography

Notes

References 
 Original LP sleevenotes

1973 albums
Kevin Ayers albums
Harvest Records albums
Sire Records albums
Albums produced by Kevin Ayers